João Sousa and Leonardo Tavares were the defending champions, but they withdrew before their match against Dasnières de Veigy and Guez.

Jonathan Dasnières de Veigy and David Guez won this tournament, defeating their compatriots Pierre-Hugues Herbert and Nicolas Renavand 5–7, 6–4, [10–5] in the final.

Seeds

  Pierre-Hugues Herbert /  Nicolas Renavand (final)
  Harri Heliövaara /  Juho Paukku (quarterfinals)
  João Sousa /  Leonardo Tavares (first round, withdrew)
  Alberto Brizzi /  Matteo Viola (first round)

Draw

Draw

References
 Main Draw

Tampere Open - Doubles
Tampere Open